Oectropsis is a genus of beetles in the family Cerambycidae, containing the following species:

 Oectropsis franciscae Barriga & Cepeda, 2006
 Oectropsis latifrons Blanchard in Gay, 1851
 Oectropsis pusillus (Blanchard in Gay, 1851)

References

Acanthocinini